Topi Piipponen (born May 2, 1997) is a Finnish professional ice hockey player. He is currently playing for Danish club, Odense Bulldogs in the Metal Ligaen (DEN).

Playing career
Piipponen made his Liiga debut playing with KalPa during the 2015–16 Liiga season. He later played three seasons in the top tier with SaiPa.

International play
Piipponen played for Finland at the 2015 IIHF World U18 Championships and won a silver medal in Finland's run to the final.

References

External links

1997 births
Living people
Finnish ice hockey forwards
Iisalmen Peli-Karhut players
KalPa players
Odense Bulldogs players
People from Siilinjärvi
SaiPa players
Sportspeople from North Savo